Valcourt is a township municipality in the Canadian province of Quebec, located within the Le Val-Saint-François Regional County Municipality. The township had a population of 1,047 in the Canada 2011 Census.

Demographics 

Mother tongue (2011)

See also
List of township municipalities in Quebec

References 

Township municipalities in Quebec
Incorporated places in Estrie